Kani Guz (also Romanized as Kānī Gūz; also known as Kānī Jowz) is a village in Gavork-e Sardasht Rural District, in the Central District of Sardasht County, West Azerbaijan Province, Iran. At the 2006 census, its population was 73, in 14 families.

References 

Populated places in Sardasht County